This is a list of museums in Bosnia and Herzegovina.

 National Museum of Bosnia and Herzegovina
 National Gallery of Bosnia and Herzegovina
 Historical Museum of Bosnia and Herzegovina
 The Herzegovina Museum
 Museum of Sarajevo
 Museum of the Old Bridge
 Museum of the National Struggle for Liberation
 Museum of Modern Art of Republika Srpska
 Museum of Old Herzegovina
 Izetbegović's museum
 Sarajevo War Tunnel Museum
 Svrzo House (Svirzina Kuća)
 Despić House (Despića Kuća)
 War Childhood Museum
 Museum of Crimes against Humanity and Genocide 1992 - 1995
 Museum of the First Proletarian Brigade, Rudo

See also 
 List of archives in Bosnia and Herzegovina
 List of libraries in Bosnia and Herzegovina

 
Bosnia and Herzegovina
Museums
Museums
Museums
Bosnia and Herzegovina